Lisa Dawn Brenner ( Goldstein; born February 12, 1974) is an American actress. Brenner played Maggie Cory on Another World. She was also in All My Children as Allison Sloan. She played Anne in the 2000 film The Patriot.

Biography
Born Lisa Goldstein, she attended Barnard College, majoring in both English and drama. She is married to Dean Devlin, and is of Jewish descent.

Filmography

Film

Television

References

External links
 

1974 births
20th-century American actresses
21st-century American actresses
21st-century American Jews
Actresses from New York (state)
American film actresses
American soap opera actresses
American television actresses
Jewish American actresses
Barnard College alumni
Living people
People from Long Island